Sean Panting is a songwriter, musician and actor based in St. John's, Newfoundland and Labrador.

Career
Panting is a founding member of the iconic Newfoundland bands Drive and Kelly Russell & The Planks. Between 2000 and 2020, he has released six albums of original songs; the most recent, The Simple Machines, was released on February 22, 2020. Panting's writing often draws comparisons with Elvis Costello, The Who's Pete Townsend, and former Hüsker Dü and Sugar front man Bob Mould, among others. 

As an actor, he is best known for his portrayal of morally bankrupt barrister Walter McLean on CBC Television's Republic of Doyle.

Panting unsuccessfully ran in the 2015 provincial election as a candidate for the district of Mount Scio, as a member of the Newfoundland and Labrador New Democratic Party. His father Gerry Panting led the NDP party from 1974 to 1977.

Discography 

 The Simple Machines (2020) – Sean Panting
 Boy on Bridge (2011) - Alan Doyle
 Man of the Year (2011) – Sean Panting
 Receiver (2005) - Sean Panting
 Victrola (2005) – Sean Panting
 Pop Disaster (2002) - Sean Panting
 Trad (2001) - The Panting Brothers
 Lotus Land (2000) - Sean Panting
 Smashed Hits (1999) - Kelly Russell and The Planks
 Jehovah's Witness Protection Program (1998) – Drive
 Blink (1996) – Drive
 Prevail (1994) – Drive

Films and television 

 Hudson and Rex (TV 2018)
 Republic of Doyle (TV 2010–2014)
 The Grand Seduction (2013)
 Grown Up Movie Star (2009)
 Love and Savagery (2009)
 Diverted (2009)
 Behind the Wall (2008)
 Heyday (2006)

External links
Spotify
Facebook

References

Musicians from St. John's, Newfoundland and Labrador
Male actors from Newfoundland and Labrador
Candidates in Newfoundland and Labrador provincial elections
Living people
Newfoundland and Labrador New Democratic Party politicians
1970 births